Exstream Software is a document management company based in Lexington, Kentucky founded by Davis Marksbury and Dan Kloiber in 1998.

The company's principal product is the Exstream software platform, which enterprise clients use to create, manage and deliver both electronic and print deliverables to customers and clients.

Overview 
In March 2008, Exstream Software was acquired by HP and was identified as HP Exstream.

In June 2016, HP Exstream was acquired by OpenText, integrating Exstream with their own software suite StreamServe, and is now correctly identified as OpenText Exstream.

Services 
The company provides different kinds of services (OpenText):

 consultations;
information management;
learning and education (Voyager Academy);
cloud management;

See also
  Customer communications management
  Document automation
  Document management system

References

External links
 

Software companies based in Kentucky
Software companies established in 1998
Document management systems
1998 establishments in Kentucky
Companies based in Lexington, Kentucky
American companies established in 1998
Hewlett-Packard acquisitions
Defunct software companies of the United States
Companies established in 1998
1998 establishments in the United States